The Rosamond Hills are a low mountain range in the Mojave Desert, in eastern Kern County, California.

The hills are located the northeastern Antelope Valley, between Rosamond and Mojave.  They are bisected by California State Route 14.

References 

Mountain ranges of the Mojave Desert
Mountain ranges of Kern County, California
Hills of California
Antelope Valley
Mountain ranges of Southern California